James Alfred Belcher (born 31 October 1932), known as Jimmy Belcher or Jim Belcher, is an English former professional footballer who played as a wing half.

Career
Born in Stepney, Belcher played for Leyton Orient, Snowdown Colliery Welfare, West Ham United, Crystal Palace, Ipswich Town, Brentford and Margate.

Personal life 
As of November 2013, Belcher was living in Rainham, Kent.

Career statistics

References

1932 births
Living people
English footballers
Leyton Orient F.C. players
West Ham United F.C. players
Crystal Palace F.C. players
Ipswich Town F.C. players
Brentford F.C. players
Margate F.C. players
English Football League players
Association football wing halves
Footballers from Stepney
Snowdown Colliery Welfare F.C. players